József Mogyorósi (born 1 November 1978 in Budapest) is a Hungarian football (defender) player who currently plays for UFC Eferding in Austria.

References

References 
HLSZ 
Nemzeti Sport 
MLSZ 

1978 births
Living people
Footballers from Budapest
Hungarian footballers
Association football defenders
Újpest FC players
Ferencvárosi TC footballers
First Vienna FC players
Csepel SC footballers
FC Tatabánya players
Diósgyőri VTK players
Budapest Honvéd FC players
BFC Siófok players
Kecskeméti TE players
FC Ajka players
Nemzeti Bajnokság I players
Hungarian expatriate footballers
Expatriate footballers in Austria
Hungarian expatriate sportspeople in Austria